Brassaiopsis dumicola, synonym Euaraliopsis dumicola, is a species of flowering plant in the family Araliaceae, native to China (south-western Yunnan) and northern Vietnam. It was first described by William Wright Smith in 1917.

Description
Brassaiopsis dumicola is a shrub or a tree, growing to 9 m tall. Its leaves have about nine deeply divided lobes. The lateral inflorescence is pendent, with umbels about 3 cm in diameter borne on branched axes. The stout pedicels are about 5–8 mm long and are surrounded by stiff bracteoles 4–10 mm long.

Conservation
Euaraliopsis dumicola was assessed as "endangered" in the 2004 IUCN Red List, where it is said to be native only to Yunnan. , Plants of the World Online regarded E. dumicola as a synonym of Brassaiopsis dumicola, which has a wider distribution.

References

dumicola
Flora of Yunnan
Flora of Vietnam
Plants described in 1916